The 2013–14 TCU Horned Frogs basketball team represented Texas Christian University in the 2013–14 NCAA Division I men's basketball season. This was head coach Trent Johnson's second season at TCU. They played their home games at Daniel–Meyer Coliseum in Fort Worth, Texas and were members of the Big 12 Conference. They finished the season 9–22, 0–18 in Big 12 play to finish in last place. They lost in the first round of the Big 12 tournament to Baylor.

Before the season

Departures

Recruits

Roster

Schedule and results 

|-
!colspan=9 style="background:#520063; color:#FFFFFF;"| Exhibition

|-
!colspan=9 style="background:#520063; color:#FFFFFF;"| Non-conference games

|-
!colspan=9 style="background:#520063; color:#FFFFFF;"| Conference games

|-
!colspan=9 style="background:#520063; color:#FFFFFF;"| Big 12 tournament

References 

TCU
TCU Horned Frogs men's basketball seasons